is a  quasi-national park in central Iwate Prefecture, in the Tōhoku region of northern Japan. It is rated a protected landscape (category II) according to the IUCN.

The alpine zone and forest vegetation of Mounts Hayachine and Yakushi is a designated Special Natural Monument spanning the municipalities of Hanamaki, Tōno, and Miyako (former village of Kawai). The area is celebrated for its flora and also for its place in Japanese folklore, most notably as collected in Tōno Monogatari.

Like all Quasi-National Parks in Japan, Hayachine Quasi-National Park is managed by the local prefectural government.

See also

 National Parks of Japan
 List of Special Places of Scenic Beauty, Special Historic Sites and Special Natural Monuments

References
Southerland, Mary and Britton, Dorothy. The National Parks of Japan. Kodansha International (1995). 

National parks of Japan
Parks and gardens in Iwate Prefecture
Protected areas established in 1982
1982 establishments in Japan
Hanamaki, Iwate
Tōno, Iwate
Miyako, Iwate